Thomas Stangl (born 4 January 1966 in Vienna) is an Austrian writer.

Life  
Thomas Stangl studied philosophy and Spanish at the University of Vienna and graduated in 1991 with a thesis on deconstructive literary theory. After graduation, he initially wrote essays, book reviews, and even smaller prose work for newspapers and literary journals. 
 
Thomas Stangl lives in Vienna.

Honours  
For his debut novel Der einzige Ort (The only place) the author received the Aspekte-Literaturpreis in 2004, the same year a Hermann-Lenz Scholarship, and the 2005 Literature Prize of the Austrian Federal Chancellery. 
In June 2007, he received the Telekom Austria Prize at the Ingeborg Bachmann competition; in October 2007, the Literature Prize of the Cultural Committee of German Economy, 2009, a grant from the Heinrich-Heine-house of the city of Lüneburg, 2010 Literature Prize Alpha and the 2011 Erich Fried Prize. In 2020, he received the Johann-Friedrich-von-Cotta-Literatur- und Übersetzerpreis der Landeshauptstadt Stuttgart.

Works
Der einzige Ort. Novel, Droschl, Graz 2004, .
Ihre Musik. Novel, Droschl, Graz 2006, .
Was kommt. Novel, Droschl, Graz 2009, .
Reisen und Gespenster. Essays, Droschl, Graz 2012, .
Regeln des Tanzes, Novel, Droschl, Graz 2013,

References

External links

 

Austrian male writers
1966 births
Living people
University of Vienna alumni